Delaware, United States has several bodies of water to fish, both fresh and salt water.  The state borders the Atlantic Ocean, and contains many small freshwater ponds and rivers.

Freshwater 

List of freshwater bodies of water by county operated by the state:
Sussex County

Kent County

New Castle County
 Becks Pond
 Lums Pond (state park)

Other
Tidburry Creek located in Kent County contains stocked Trout.

There are also several other ponds that are not operated by the state.  These ponds are either city ponds or private ponds.  All of the ponds are fishable, some requiring a license.

 Silver Lake, Dover
 Noxontown Pond, Middletown
 Lake Como, Smyrna
 Wyoming Mill Pond, Wyoming/Camden

External links
 Official DNREC Freshwater Fishing Regulations

Fishing in the United States
Sports in Delaware
Environment of Delaware